Qaleh Tall Rural District is a rural district (dehestan) in the Central District of Bagh-e Malek County, Khuzestan Province, Iran. At the 2006 census, its population was 8,403, in 1,690 families.  The rural district has 36 villages.

References 

Rural Districts of Khuzestan Province
Bagh-e Malek County